This is a list of players who played at least one game for the Quebec Nordiques of the World Hockey Association (1972–73 to 1978–79). For a list of players who played for the Nordiques in the National Hockey League, see List of Quebec Nordiques players.



A
Michel Archambault,
Serge Aubry,

B
Dave Balon,
Paul Baxter,
Alain Beaule,
Jim Benzelock,
Yves Bergeron,
Jean Bernier,
Serge Bernier,
Gilles Bilodeau,
Jim Blain,
Chris Bordeleau,
Paulin Bordeleau,
Andre Boudrias,
Curt Brackenbury,
Ken Broderick,
Richard Brodeur,

C
Alain Caron,
Jean-Yves Cartier,
Real Cloutier,
Charles Constantin,
Jim Corsi,
Alain Cote (born 1957),
John Cunniff,

D
Richard David,
Michel DeGuise,
Norm Descoteaux,
Ken Desjardine,
Kevin Devine,
Pete Donnelly,
Jim Dorey,
Peter Driscoll,
Norm Dube,
Michel Dubois,
Guy Dufour,

E
Chris Evans

F
Bob Fitchner,
Florent Fortier,

G
Gord Gallant,
Jean-Claude Garneau,
Andre Gaudette,
Jean-Guy Gendron,
Dan Geoffrion,
Jeannot Gilbert,
Rejean Giroux,
Alan Globensky,
Frank Golembrosky,
Richard Grenier,
Gary Gresdal,
Bob Guindon,
Pierre Guite,

H
Matti Hagman,
Ted Hampson,
Michel Harvey,
Dale Hoganson,
Rejean Houle,
Ed Humphreys,

I
Dave Inkpen,

J
Ric Jordan,

L
Francois Lacombe,
Pierre Lagace,
Garry Lariviere,
Paul Larose,
Rene LeClerc,
Rich LeDuc,
Jacques Lemelin,
Louis Levasseur,

M
Markus Mattsson,
Don McLeod,
Mike McNamara,
Warren Miller,
Rick Morris,
Kevin Morrison,

P
Michel Parizeau,
Denis Patry,
Jean Payette,
Bill Prentice,

R
Michel Rouleau,
Pierre Roy,

S
Brit Selby,
Tom Serviss,
Steve Sutherland,

T
Marc Tardif,
J.C. Tremblay,

W
Jim Watson,
Wally Weir,

References
WHA Quebec Nordiques on hockeydb.com

Quebec Nordiques
 
players